The Federated Parliamentary Club (Federacyjny Klub Parlamentarny, FKP) was a parliamentary faction in Polish Sejm consisting of the People's Democratic Party and National Party of Retirees and Pensioners and former members of Polish People's Party, Democratic Left Alliance and Samoobrona.

After the FKP was dissolved in 2005, most of its deputies founded a minor party Stronnictwo Gospodarcze (Party for the Economy, SG). 

External link: Party for the Economy - parliamentary faction

Leaders 

 Roman Jagieliński, leader (formerly Partia Ludowo-Demokratyczna)

Members of Polish Parliament (Sejm) 

MP, constituency

 Ryszard Chodynicki, Toruń, former member of SLD-UP
 Michał Figlus, Sonowiec, former member of Samoobrona
 Franciszek Franczak, Wałbrzych, former member of Samoobrona
 Stanisław Głębocki, Lublin, former member of Samoobrona
 Józef Głowa, Krosno, former member of Samoobrona
 Roman Jagieliński, Piotrków Trybunalski, former member of SLD-UP
 Andrzej Jagiełło, Kielce, former member of SLD-UP
 Zbigniew Musiał, Piotrków Trybunalski, former member of SLD-UP
 Jerzy Pękała, Płock, former member of Samoobrona
 Krzysztof Rutkowski, Łódź, former member of Samoobrona
 Józef Skutecki, Kalisz, former member of Samoobrona
 Zbigniew Witaszek, Warsaw, former member of Samoobrona
 Adam Woś, Krosno, former member of PSL
 Leszek Zieliński, Chrzanów, former member of PSL
 Lech Zielonka, Gdynia, former member of Samoobrona

Defunct political parties in Poland